Sum 41 is a Canadian rock band from Ajax, Ontario. Originally called Kaspir, the band was formed in 1996 and currently consists of  Deryck Whibley (lead vocals, guitars, keyboards), Dave Baksh (lead guitar, backing vocals), Jason "Cone" McCaslin (bass, backing vocals), Tom Thacker (guitars, keyboards, backing vocals), and Frank Zummo (drums, percussion, occasional backing vocals).

In 1999, Sum 41 signed an international record deal with Island Records and released its first EP, Half Hour of Power, in 2000. The band released its debut album, All Killer No Filler, in 2001. The album achieved mainstream success with its first single, "Fat Lip", which reached number one on the Billboard Modern Rock Tracks chart and remains the band's most successful single to date. The album's next singles "In Too Deep" and "Motivation" also achieved commercial success. All Killer No Filler was certified platinum in both the United States and the United Kingdom and triple platinum in Canada. In 2002, the band released Does This Look Infected?, which was also a commercial and critical success. The singles "The Hell Song" and "Still Waiting" both charted highly on the modern rock charts.

The band released its next album, Chuck, in 2004, led by singles "We're All to Blame" and "Pieces". The album proved successful, peaking at number 10 on the Billboard 200. In 2007, the band released Underclass Hero, which was met with a mixed reception, but became the band's highest-charting album to date. It was also the band's last album on Aquarius Records. The band released the album Screaming Bloody Murder, on Island Records in 2011 to a generally positive reception, though it fell short of its predecessors' commercial success. The band's sixth studio album, 13 Voices was released in 2016. IMPALA awarded the album with a double gold award for 150,000 sold copies across Europe. The band's seventh studio album Order in Decline was released on July 19, 2019. The band is in production of their eighth studio album titled Heaven and Hell. A release date has yet to be announced.

The band often performs more than 300 times each year and holds long global tours, most of which last more than a year. The group have been nominated for seven Juno Awards and won twice – Group of the Year in 2003, and Rock Album of the Year for Chuck in 2005. Sum 41 was nominated for a Grammy Award for Best Hard Rock/Metal Performance for the song "Blood in My Eyes". From their formation to 2016, Sum 41 were the 31st best-selling Canadian artist in Canada and among the top 10 best-selling Canadian bands in Canada.

History

1996–1998: Formative years
Sum 41 was formed by guitarist Deryck Whibley, drummer Steve Jocz, bassist Richard Roy and vocalist Jon Marshall. They were originally called Kaspir. The band is from Ajax, Ontario. the band was formed as a NOFX cover band. The group members decided to change the band's name to Supernova while on tour on September 28, 1996, which happened to be the 41st day of their summer vacation, leading them to change their name to Sum 41.
 
The band met their manager and producer Greig Nori in 1996 at their first show as Sum 41. Whibley convinced Nori to watch his band perform.  Nori is also the lead vocalist of the band Treble Charger. Nori was not impressed with the band's songs or original vocalist and advised Whibley to be the vocalist, causing Marshall to leave.  With Whibley moving to lead vocals and rhythm guitar, Dave Baksh joined as lead guitarist. Early on; the band was involved in a near-fatal car accident, resulting in Roy leaving the band. Mark Spicoluk briefly filled in the position before Jason McCaslin was brought in on bass to complete the new line-up. In 1996, the band opened for Len.

1998–2000: Half Hour of Power

In 1998, the band recorded a demo tape on compact cassette which they sent to record companies in the hope of getting a recording contract.

From 1999 to 2000, the band recorded several new songs. The Introduction to Destruction and later the Cross The T's and Gouge Your I's DVDs both contain the self-recorded footage, which show the band performing a dance to "Makes No Difference" in front of a theatre.

After signing with Island Records in 1999, Sum 41's first EP, Half Hour of Power, was released on June 27, 2000. The first single released by the band was "Makes No Difference", which had two different music videos. The first video was put together using the video clips sent to the record label, and the second showed the band performing at a house party. The album was certified platinum in Canada.

2001–2003: All Killer No Filler and Does This Look Infected?

Sum 41's first full-length album, All Killer No Filler, was released on May 8, 2001. The album was very successful; it was certified platinum by the Recording Industry Association of America in August 2001. "Fat Lip", the album's first single, achieved significant chart and commercial success; it topped the US Billboard Modern Rock Tracks chart as well as many other charts around the world. The song remains the band's most successful to date. After "Fat Lip", two more singles were released from the album: "In Too Deep" and "Motivation". "In Too Deep" peaked at number 10 on the Modern Rock Tracks chart, while "Motivation" peaked at number 24 on the same chart. The album peaked at number 13 on the Billboard 200 chart and at number nine on the Top Canadian Albums chart. The album was a commercial success, and was certified Platinum in the United States, UK, and triple platinum in Canada The album's name was taken from the initial reaction from Joe Mcgrath, an engineer working in the studio.

The band spent much of 2001 touring; the group played over 300 concerts that year before returning to the studio to record another album. The band took part in the 2001 Vans Warped Tour and the Campus Invasion Tour. In April 2002, the band went on a month long tour called the Sum Like it Loud Tour. In October 2002, the band went on a month long tour called the Sum on Your Face Tour.

On November 26, 2002, the group released its second album, Does This Look Infected? The special edition came with a DVD, Cross The T's and Gouge Your I's. Whibley said of the album: "We don't want to make another record that sounds like the last record, I hate when bands repeat albums. The album featured a harder and edgier sound, and the lyrics featured a more serious outlook. The album peaked at number 32 on the Billboard 200 chart and at number eight on the Top Canadian Albums chart. It was certified Platinum in Canada and gold in the United States.

The first single released from the album was "Still Waiting", which peaked at number seven on the Modern Rock Tracks chart. The second single, "The Hell Song" peaked at number 13 on the chart. "The Hell Song"'s music video depicted the band members using dolls with their pictures on them and others, such as Korn, Kiss, AC/DC, Snoop Dogg, Destiny's Child, Ozzy Osbourne, Sharon Osbourne, and Pamela Anderson. The third single, "Over My Head (Better Off Dead)", had a video released exclusively in Canada and on the band's website, featuring live shots of the band. The video also appeared on the group's live DVD, Sake Bombs And Happy Endings (2003), as a bonus feature. The band again began a long tour to promote the album before recording the group's third studio album.

2004–2005: Chuck

In late May 2004, the band traveled to the Democratic Republic of Congo with War Child Canada, a branch of the British charity organization War Child, to document the country's civil war. Days after arriving, fighting broke out in Bukavu near the hotel where the band was staying. The band waited for the fighting to die down, but it did not. A UN peacekeeper, Charles "Chuck" Pelletier, called for armoured carriers to take the hotel's occupants out of the hot zone. After nearly twenty hours, the carriers arrived, and the band and forty other civilians were taken to safety.

In honor of Pelletier, Sum 41 named its next album Chuck; it was released on October 12, 2004. The album charted at number 10 on the Billboard 200 chart. It also peaked at number two on the Canadian Albums chart. The album received positive reviews, and was certified Platinum in Canada and gold in the United States.

The first single from the album was "We're All To Blame", which peaked at number 10 on the Alternative Airplay chart. It was followed by "Pieces", which reached the top of the charts in Canada. The next single was "Some Say", released only in Canada and Japan. The last single from the record was "No Reason", released at the same time as "Some Say", but with no music video. It was released only in Europe and the US, where it reached number 16 on the Billboard Modern Rock chart. In 2004, the band went on a co-headlining North American Tour with Good Charlotte. The band joined Mötley Crüe on their Carnival of Sin summer tour as an opening act.

A documentary of the band's experience in Congo was made into a film called Rocked: Sum 41 in Congo and later aired on MTV. War Child released it on DVD on November 29, 2005, in the United States and Canada. Following the album's release, the band went on a tour with Good Charlotte until 2006. On December 21, 2005, Sum 41 released a live album, Happy Live Surprise, in Japan. The CD contained a full concert recorded live in London, Ontario. The same CD was released March 7, 2006, in Canada under the name Go Chuck Yourself. The band played videos before its set that were deemed "unsuitable for children". Controversy arose over some of the videos' violent content.

2006–2008: Baksh's departure and Underclass Hero

On May 10, 2006, Dave Baksh announced in a statement through his management company that he was leaving Sum 41 to work with his new band, Brown Brigade, which has a more "classic metal" sound. Baksh cited "creative differences" as the reason for his departure, but claimed that he was still on good terms with the band.
The next day, Whibley confirmed Baksh's departure and announced that the band would only replace him with a touring guitarist, who would not have any decision-making power in the band or be in videos, photo shoots, or albums. The band hired Gob frontman and guitarist Tom Thacker to replace Baksh.

Recording of the band's fourth studio album, Underclass Hero, began on November 8, 2006, and finished on March 14, 2007. On April 17, 2007, the band released a song on iTunes, "March of the Dogs". Although not a single, the band released it early because, according to Whibley, "the record [wouldn't] be out until the summer". Whibley was threatened with deportation for the song, because he metaphorically "killed the president" on it.

The album, backed by the first single and title track, "Underclass Hero", was released on July 24, 2007. Despite mixed reviews, the album was a commercial success, debuting at number seven on the Billboard 200 and at number one on the Billboard Rock Albums chart, the band's highest US chart position to date. It also peaked at number one on the Canadian Albums chart and on the Alternative Albums chart. Two more singles were released from the album, "Walking Disaster" and "With Me". Underclass Hero was certified Platinum in Canada. On September 15, 2007, the band headlined the House of Blues with Yellowcard.

In October 2007, the band began the Strength in Numbers Tour, a tour of Canada with Canadian band Finger Eleven; Die Mannequin opened each of Sum 41's shows. During the tour, Whibley sustained a herniated disk. As a result, the group cancelled the rest of its shows. After Whibley recovered from his injury, the band continued the Underclass Hero tour in March 2008 and toured until early July, when the group began preparation for its next album.

Sum 41 released a greatest hits album in Japan titled 8 Years of Blood, Sake and Tears in November 2008. The album included a previously unreleased song, "Always", and a DVD, which contains each of the band's music videos. On March 17, the band released the worldwide version of the album titled All the Good Shit.

2009–2012: Thacker's official arrival and Screaming Bloody Murder

In July 2009, the band was an opening act for The Offspring on their Shit is Fucked Up Tour. Drummer Steve Jocz confirmed that Tom Thacker was now an official member of Sum 41, and would take part in the writing and recording. On November 5, 2009, Whibley posted a blog on the band's MySpace page announcing Gil Norton as the producer of the band's upcoming album, also saying that 20 songs were already written for the album. In an interview with Tom Thacker, some working titles for songs for the new album were confirmed, including "Panic Attack", "Jessica Kill" and "Like Everyone Else". Pre-production for the new album took 13 days in December 2009, with the band officially entering the studio to begin recording at Perfect Sound Studios on January 26, 2010. The new studio album, titled Screaming Bloody Murder, was expected for a late 2010 release, but was delayed until early 2011. The band finished recording on June 24, 2010, just before joining the 2010 Warped Tour. While the group was on the tour, the new album entered the post-production stages of mixing and mastering. A new song called "Skumfuk" was leaked online on July 6, 2010. In an interview with Canoe.ca, Steve Jocz said that while producer Gil Norton was originally hired to engineer the new album, he was only around for a week and Sum 41 self-produced the record.

The first single from the album, "Screaming Bloody Murder", was released on February 7, 2011, in the United States. On February 28, 2011, a stream of "Blood in My Eyes", another new song from the album, was released for free listening on Alternative Press. The album Screaming Bloody Murder was released on March 29, 2011. On May 28, 2011, Sum 41 performed a live set for Guitar Center Sessions on DirecTV. The episode included an interview with program host Nic Harcourt.

"Baby You Don't Wanna Know" was released as the album's second single. A music video was also produced for the first single, "Screaming Bloody Murder", but it was left unreleased due to its content and difficulties with the label.

On August 9, 2011, Sum 41 released the live album Live at the House of Blues, Cleveland 9.15.07 – a live recording of a show that took place on September 15, 2007, in Cleveland, Ohio, while the band was touring its previous album Underclass Hero. A week later when the band was touring the US as part of the Vans Warped Tour, they were forced once again to cancel all remaining dates, when Whibley re-injured his back after playing three shows. It was announced on the band's official website that they would be postponing indefinitely all upcoming tour dates for 2011 while Whibley underwent treatment. In 2011, Sum 41 was nominated for a Grammy Award for Best Hard Rock/Metal Performance for the song "Blood in My Eyes", but lost to the Foo Fighters.

In February 2012, the band shot a music video for the song "Blood in My Eyes", the third single from the album, with director Michael Maxxis in Los Angeles. It was released officially released on September 10, 2012.

From November to December 2012, the band undertook the Does This Look Infected? 10th Anniversary Tour, touring the United States to celebrate the album's release in 2002.

On November 26, 2012, the band members revealed that they were taking a break from touring in 2013 to begin work on a new record.

2013–2018: Jocz's departure, Zummo's arrival, return of Baksh, and 13 Voices

From March to April 2013, the band co-headlined the Dead Silence Tour with Billy Talent. On April 18, 2013, drummer Jocz announced he would be leaving the band on his official Facebook page, leaving Whibley as the sole founding member of the band.

On May 16, 2014, Deryck Whibley posted on his website, explaining that he had liver and kidney failure due to excessive drinking. He also said that he had some ideas for new songs, and that the band would be soon starting to make a new album. On June 9, 2014, Whibley said on his Facebook page that he was working on new Sum 41 music out of his home studio to get ready to record some new tunes.

On July 9, 2015, the band launched a PledgeMusic campaign for its comeback album. On July 23, 2015, the band played its comeback show at the Alternative Press Awards, which featured former lead guitarist Dave Baksh, joining the band on stage nine years after his departure. The band's set also featured DMC as guest. It also introduced Frank Zummo from Street Drum Corps as the new drummer. Sum 41 confirmed Baksh's official return to the band on August 14, 2015. On December 26, 2015, Sum 41 teased two new songs on their Instagram profile.

The band performed on the 2016 Warped Tour. On May 11, 2016, the group announced its signing to Hopeless Records. The band announced on June 6, 2016 that their sixth album would be called 13 Voices and would be released on October 7, 2016. That same day, they also revealed album's track list and cover art. The first song from the upcoming album, "Fake My Own Death", was released on June 28, 2016, through Hopeless Records' official YouTube channel, along with a music video for the song. The song was performed on The Late Show with Stephen Colbert on October 3, 2016. The album's first official single, "War", was released on August 25, 2016. On September 29, 2016, the track "God Save Us All (Death to Pop)" was officially released (along with a live music video). IMPALA awarded the album with a double gold award for 150,000 sold copies across Europe.

On September 29, 2016, it was announced that the band would be headlining the 2016 Kerrang! Tour. From October 2016 to August 2017, the band went on their Don't Call It a Sum-Back Tour in support of 13 Voices. The band played nearly 100 shows in the Americas, Europe, and Asia. The band invited fans to record a music video for "Goddamn I'm Dead Again" that was released on May 3, 2017. In April 2017, the band co-headlined the 2017 Canadian Tour with Papa Roach. From April to May 2017, the band co-headlined the We Will Detonate Tour with Pierce the Veil.

On October 22, 2017, the band's Facebook page announced that Whibley had started writing new songs. The group embarked on a 15th anniversary tour of Does This Look Infected in 2018.

2019–2021: Order in Decline

From April to May 2019, the band embarked on an intimate tour called the No Personal Space Tour. In April 2019, the band announced via social media its return with new music. On April 24, 2019 they released the single, "Out for Blood" through Hopeless Records. The same day, the band also announced their seventh studio album, Order in Decline, with a set release date of July 19, 2019. The second single from the album "A Death in the Family" was released along with a music video on June 11, 2019. On June 18, 2019, "Never There" was released as the third single, along with a video. On July 8, 2019, the band released "45 (A Matter of Time)" as the fourth single, along with a video. On July 18, 2019, the band performed a medley of Metallica songs including "For Whom The Bell Tolls", "Enter Sandman", and "Master Of Puppets" at Sirius XM studios. In September 2019, the band started a North American tour called the Order in Decline Tour. On top of supporting Order in Decline, the tour was also done in support of the 15th Anniversary of their studio album Chuck. From November to December 2019, the band went on a co-headlining tour with The Offspring. On May 28, 2021, the band released a version of "Catching Fire" featuring Nothing,Nowhere, along with a music video.

2022–present: Heaven and Hell
On February 22, 2022, the band announced a U.S. tour with Simple Plan called the Blame Canada tour set to run from April to August 2022.

On March 23, 2022, the band announced their eighth studio album, Heaven and Hell, which is set to be a double album. Heaven will return to the pop punk sound of the band's early career while Hell is a continuation of the band's more recent heavier metal sound.

On February 22, 2023 it was announced that the band would be playing at When We Were Young on October 22, 2023.

Side projects and collaborations
Before the release of Half Hour of Power, and up until the departures of Dave Baksh and Steve Jocz, Sum 41 occasionally played as an alter ego 1980s heavy metal band called Pain for Pleasure during shows. The band appeared in Sum 41's music videos for "Fat Lip" and "We're All to Blame" and had at least one song on each of the band's first three releases. The group's best known song under the Pain for Pleasure moniker is the song of the same name from All Killer No Filler, a track that remains the band's staple during live shows and features drummer Steve Jocz on lead vocals. During the Don't Call It a Sum-Back Tour in 2017, Pain for Pleasure appeared performing the song at the end of their show with guitarist Tom Thacker replacing Jocz as the vocalist.

Sum 41 has collaborated with many other artists, both live and in the studio, including: Tenacious D, Ludacris, Iggy Pop, Pennywise, Bowling for Soup, Unwritten Law, Mike Shinoda, Treble Charger, Gob, Tommy Lee, Rob Halford, Kerry King, Metallica, Ja Rule, and Nothing,Nowhere.

Shortly after touring for Does This Look Infected?, Sum 41 was recruited by Iggy Pop for his album, Skull Ring. Whibley co-wrote the first single from the album, "Little Know It All", and joined Iggy on the Late Show with David Letterman to promote it. Following the band's show of September 11, 2005, in Quebec City, Quebec, the band went on a touring hiatus, although on April 17, 2006, Sum 41 played at a tribute to Iggy Pop, joining Iggy on stage for "Little Know It All" and "Lust For Life".

During the band's 2006 touring hiatus, Whibley focused on his producing career: he produced two songs for Avril Lavigne's album The Best Damn Thing. Jocz recorded his first video as director for a Canadian band, The Midway State, and McCaslin started a side project with Todd Morse of H2O and Juliette and the Licks. McCaslin's two-person band, named The Operation M.D., released its debut album, We Have an Emergency, in early 2007. In 2022, Whibley was featured on the Simple Plan single, "Ruin My Life".

Musical style, influences and legacy
Sum 41 has been described as pop-punk, skate punk, punk rock, heavy metal, alternative metal, melodic hardcore, alternative rock, thrash metal, punk metal, nu metal, arena rock, hard rock, and pop rock.
The band also uses elements of rap, like on the song Fat Lip.

In a November 2004 interview, Deryck Whibley said: "We don't even consider ourselves punk. We're just a rock band. We want to do something different. We want to do our own thing. That's how music has always been to us." Dave Baksh reiterated Whibley's claims, stating "We just call ourselves rock... It's easier to say than punk, especially around all these fuckin' kids that think they know what punk is. Something that was based on not having any rules has probably one of the strictest fucking rule books in the world."

The band's style has been disputed by fans because of the complex combination of different musical styles and the more mature, serious, and heavy sound on later albums. The band's EP Half Hour of Power is described as pop-punk and skate punk. All Killer No Filler was described as pop-punk and skate punk (except for "Pain for Pleasure", which is purely heavy metal). Does This Look Infected? has been described as punk rock, pop-punk melodic hardcore, horror punk, and heavy metal. Chuck was getting heavier opting out the original pop-punk sound with a heavy metal sound, but the band kept in touch with its punk rock and melodic hardcore roots, which created an even more mature sound than the group's previous effort. Critics have described Underclass Hero as a revival of the band's pop-punk style. Screaming Bloody Murder and 13 Voices saw the band return to some metal influences. Some of the band's songs contain political-social commentary; "Still Waiting" is an anti-George W. Bush and anti-Iraq War song, "The Jester" and "March of the Dogs" also are critical of Bush, "45 (A Matter of Time)" is critical of President Donald Trump, "Underclass Hero" is a song about class struggle, and "Dear Father" is about Whibley's absent father.

Sum 41's influences include Weezer, Slayer, the Police, Devo, Megadeth, Pennywise, Rancid, No Use for a Name, the Vandals, Anthrax, Carcass, Dio, Judas Priest, Foo Fighters, Green Day, NOFX, Lagwagon, Face to Face, Nirvana, the Beatles (including John Lennon's solo work), Elvis Costello, Beastie Boys,  Rob Base and DJ E-Z Rock, Metallica, Guns N' Roses, and Iron Maiden.

Sum 41 has inspired modern artists such as 5 Seconds of Summer, Seaway, Dune Rats, Marshmello, PVRIS, Trash Boat, Neck Deep, the Vamps, Bully Waterparks, and ROAM.

Band members

Current members
 Deryck Whibley – lead vocals, rhythm guitar (1997–present), keyboards (2004–present), lead guitar (1996–1997, studio 2006–2007), backing vocals (1996–1997), occasional drums (1997–2015)
 Dave Baksh – lead guitar, backing vocals (1997–2006; 2015–present)
 Jason McCaslin – bass, backing vocals (1999–present)
 Tom Thacker – rhythm and lead guitar, keyboards, backing vocals (2007–present)
 Frank Zummo – drums, percussion, occasional backing vocals (2015–present)

Touring musicians
 Matt Whibley – keyboards (2011)
 Darrin Pfeiffer – drums (2015)

Former members
 Steve Jocz – drums, percussion, backing vocals, occasional lead and co-lead vocals (1996–2013)
 Jon Marshall – lead vocals, rhythm guitar (1996–1997)
 Richard Roy – bass (1996–1998)
 Mark Spicoluk – bass (1998–1999)

Timeline

Discography

Studio albums
 All Killer No Filler (2001)
 Does This Look Infected? (2002)
 Chuck (2004)
 Underclass Hero (2007)
 Screaming Bloody Murder (2011)
 13 Voices (2016)
 Order in Decline (2019)
 Heaven and Hell (TBA)

Tours

Headlining
 Tour of the Rising Sum 
 Sum Like it Loud Tour 
 Sum on Your Face Tour 
 Go Chuck Yourself Tour 
 European in Your Pants Tour 
 Screaming Bloody Murder Tour 
 Does This Look Infected?: 10th Anniversary Tour 
 20th Anniversary Tour 
 Don't Call It a Sum-Back Tour 
 Does This Look Infected?: 15th Anniversary Tour 
 No Personal Space Tour 
 Order In Decline Tour 
 Chuck: 15th Anniversary Tour

Co-headlining
 2004 North American Tour 
 For One Night Only 
 Strength in Numbers Tour 
 2008 Australian Tour 
 Dead Silence Tour 
 2017 Canadian Tour 
 We Will Detonate Tour 
 2019 Canadian Tour 
 Blame Canada Tour 

Traveling festival
 Warped Tour 
 Campus Invasion Tour 
  
 Kerrang! Tour 

Opening act
 Pay Attention Tour 
 Conspiracy of One Tour 
 1st Annual Honda Civic Tour 
 Carnival of Sins Tour 
 The Sufferer & the Witness Tour 
 Shit is Fucked Up Tour 
 One More Light World Tour

Awards and nominations

A select list of Sum 41's awards and nominations.

!
|-
|rowspan="3"| 2001 || "Sum 41" || Juno Award – Best New Group  || 
| 
|-
|| "Makes No Difference" || MuchMusic Video Award – People's Choice: Favorite Canadian Group || 
| 
|-
|| "Fat Lip" || MTV Video Music Award – Best New Artist in a Video ||  
| 
|-
|rowspan="3"| 2002 || "Sum 41" || Juno Award – Best Group || 
| 
|-
|| "All Killer No Filler" || Juno Award – Best Album || 
| 
|-
|| "In Too Deep" || MuchMusic Video Award – MuchLoud Best Rock Video || 
| 
|-
|rowspan="2"| 2003 || "Sum 41" || Juno Award – Group of the Year || 
| 
|-
|| "Sum 41" || Kerrang! Award – Best Live Act  || 
| 
|-
|rowspan="2"| 2004 || "Does This Look Infected?" || Juno Award – Rock Album of the Year || 
| 
|-
|| "Sum 41" || Woodie Award – The Good Woodie (Greatest Social Impact) || 
| 
|-
| rowspan="3"| 2005 || "Sum 41" || Juno Award – Group of the Year || 
| 
|-
|| "Chuck" || Juno Award – Rock Album of the Year || 
| 
|-
|| "Pieces" || MuchMusic Video Award – People's Choice: Favourite Canadian Group || 
| 
|-
|rowspan="2"| 2008 || "With Me" || MuchMusic Video Award – MuchLOUD Best Rock Video || 
| 
|-
|| "Underclass Hero" ||  Juno Award – Rock Album of the Year || 
| 
|-
|2012 || "Blood in My Eyes" || Grammy Award for Best Hard Rock/Metal Performance || 
| 
|-
|rowspan="2"| 2016 || "Sum 41" || Kerrang! Award – Best Live Act || 
| 
|-
|| "Sum 41" || Kerrang! Award – Best Fanbase  || 
| 
|-
|rowspan="3"| 2017 || "Frank Zummo" || Alternative Press Music Awards – Best Drummer || 
| 
|-
|| "Fake My Own Death" || Alternative Press Music Awards – Best Music Video  || 
| 
|-
|| "Sum 41" || Alternative Press Music Awards – Artist of the Year  || 
| 
|-
|2020
|| "Order in Decline" ||  Juno Award – Rock Album of the Year || 
|

Notes

References

External links

 
 
 CanadianBands.com entry

 
1996 establishments in Ontario
Canadian alternative metal musical groups
Canadian pop punk groups
Canadian punk rock groups
Skate punk groups
Juno Award for Group of the Year winners
Kerrang! Awards winners
Musical groups established in 1996
Musical groups from the Regional Municipality of Durham
Musical quartets
Ajax, Ontario
Articles which contain graphical timelines
Hopeless Records artists
Juno Award for Rock Album of the Year winners